Doctor Habib-o-llah Metro Station is a station of Tehran Metro Line 4. It is located in Azadi street on Dr. Habib-o-llah cross.

References 

Tehran Metro stations